Edward Banks JP (1817 – 2 May 1866) was an English architect based in Wolverhampton.

Life

He was a pupil of Charles Fowler. He worked in partnership with George Bidlake for a short period.

As well as being an architect, he served as a town councillor in Wolverhampton and was a member of the Public Works Committee. He additionally served as a Magistrate.

He died on 2 May 1866.

Works

School of Art and Design, Wolverhampton
Cattle Market, Wolverhampton
Royal Hospital, Wolverhampton
Compton Hall, Wolverhampton 1845
St Nicholas' Church, Codsall, Staffordshire 1846 - 1848
Queen's Building, Wolverhampton 1849
St Matthew's Church, Wolverhampton 1849
Holy Trinity Church, Heath Town 1850 - 1852
All Saints’ Church, Catfield, Norfolk 1852
Houses in Brickkiln Street, Wolverhampton 1853
St Paul's Church, Coven, Staffordshire 1857
St Milburger’s Church, Beckbury 1857
St John's Church, Stretton nave and transepts rebuild 1860
Mander Brothers works, John Street, Wolverhampton rebuilt about 1860
St Andrew's Church, Wolverhampton 1865
Christ Church, Wolverhampton 1867
St Andrew’s Church, Chinnor

References

1817 births
1866 deaths
19th-century English architects
Architects from Staffordshire
People from Wolverhampton